is a Japanese politician of the Democratic Party of Japan (DPJ), a member of the House of Representatives in the Diet (national legislature).

Overview 

A native of Oyama, Tochigi and graduate of Keio University, he was elected to the first of two terms in the House of Councilors in 1983 and then to the House of Representatives for the first time in 1993. After losing his seat in 1996 as a member of the New Frontier Party, he was re-elected in 2000 as a member of the Liberal Democratic Party (LDP). He later joined the DPJ. He married the daughter of writer Sōhachi Yamaoka and was adopted into the family.

In September 2011 he was appointed as chairman of the National Public Safety Commission、Minister of State for Consumer Affairs and Food Safety and Minister for the Abduction Issue. in the cabinet of newly appointed Prime Minister Yoshihiko Noda.

In December 2011 he was the subject of a censure motion from the opposition LDP for failing to declare receiving ¥450,000 from a health food company allegedly involved in a pyramid scheme in 2008, and ¥2.54 million from other organizations involved in pyramid schemes between 2005 and 2008. As consumer affairs chief he was responsible for the Consumer Affairs Agency, which among other things is responsible for protecting consumers against pyramid schemes. Yamaoka said he has returned all the money to the donors. In the cabinet reshuffle of January 13, 2012 he was replaced in both of his cabinet roles by Jin Matsubara.

Notes

References

External links
 Official website in Japanese.

Living people
1943 births
New Frontier Party (Japan) politicians
20th-century Japanese politicians
Liberal Democratic Party (Japan) politicians
Democratic Party of Japan politicians
Members of the House of Councillors (Japan)
Members of the House of Representatives (Japan)
Keio University alumni
21st-century Japanese politicians